Four (Acts of Love) is the sixth studio album by Australian singer-songwriter Mick Harvey – and his second since leaving Nick Cave & The Bad Seeds. It was released in June 2013 under Mute Records. The 14 tracks make up a song cycle, bookended by "Praise the Earth (Wheels of Amber and Gold)" and "Praise the Earth (An Ephemeral Play)". The album includes eclectic covers including The Saints' punk "The Story of Love", P. J. Harvey's "Glorious" – she also duets with Harvey on the track – and Van Morrison's "The Way Young Lovers Do" off the classic Astral Weeks.

Track listing
All tracks composed by Mick Harvey; except where indicated

Personnel
Mick Harvey – vocals, keyboards, drums, percussion, acoustic guitar, electric guitar, photography
J.P. Shilo – electric guitar, violin
Rosie Westbrook – double bass
Technical
David McCluney – engineer

References

External links
Four (Acts of Love) at iTunes.com

2013 albums
Mute Records albums
Mick Harvey albums